The Charitable Donations and Bequests (Ireland) Act 1844 or the Charitable Bequests Act was introduced by Sir Robert Peel in 1844, in an attempt to win over moderate Catholic support. The act enabled Catholics to leave money and items in their last will and testament to the Catholic Church. The act made parish priests less dependent on their parishioners for financial support.

References

United Kingdom Acts of Parliament 1844
1844 in British law
1844 in Ireland
Acts of the Parliament of the United Kingdom concerning Ireland